The Long–Allen Bridge is a truss bridge in the U.S. state of Louisiana which carries LA 182 over the Atchafalaya River between Berwick and Morgan City.

This bridge was built by the  Mt. Vernon Bridge Co. of Mt. Vernon, Ohio, and opened for traffic in 1933.  This bridge once served as a major crossing along the Old Spanish Trail and US 90 before the E. J. "Lionel" Grizzaffi Bridge opened in 1975.

Construction
The bridge was completed in 1933, with a K-truss design, across the Atchafalaya River.

See also
 Long–Allen Bridge (disambiguation) for other bridges named for the same two governors

References

Road bridges in Louisiana
Bridges completed in 1933
1933 establishments in Louisiana
Buildings and structures in St. Mary Parish, Louisiana